The Everly Brothers Show is a live album by the Everly Brothers, released in 1970.

The Everly Brothers Show was a one-hour musical variety show on the ABC television network. It began as a summer replacement in 1970 for The Johnny Cash Show. Warner Bros. Records released a double LP at the same time, but the album was not a soundtrack to the TV series.

It was re-issued on CD set by Collector's Choice Records in 2005.

Track listing
 Introduction – 1:31 
 "Mama Tried" (Merle Haggard) – 2:03
 "Kentucky" (Carl Davis) – 2:43
 "Bowling Green" (Jacqueline Ertel, Terry Slater) – 2:34
 "(Till) I Kissed You" (Don Everly) – 1:56
 "Wake Up Little Susie" (Felice Bryant, Boudleaux Bryant) – 1:42
 "Cathy's Clown" (Don Everly) – 1:23
 "Bird Dog" (Boudleaux Bryant) – 1:57
 "Maybellene" (Chuck Berry, Russ Fratto, Alan Freed) – 2:16
 Medley – 18:39
 "Rock and Roll Music" (Berry)
 "The End" (John Lennon, Paul McCartney)
 "Aquarius" (James Rado, Gerome Ragni, Galt MacDermot)
 "If I Were a Carpenter" (Tim Hardin)
 "The Price of Love" (Everly, Everly)
 "The Thrill Is Gone" (Arthur H. Benson, Dale Pettite)
 "Games People Play" (Joe South)
 "Baby What You Want Me to Do" (Jimmy Reed) – 4:52
 "All I Have to Do Is Dream" (Boudleaux Bryant) – 3:11
 "Walk Right Back" (Sonny Curtis) – 2:09
 "Susie Q/Hey Jude" (Eleanor Broadwater, Dale Hawkins, Stan Lewis; Lennon, McCartney) – 5:23
 "Lord of the Manor" (Terry Slater) – 4:12
 "I Wonder If I Care as Much" (Everly, Everly) – 3:11
 "Love Is Strange" ("Ethel Smith") – 3:59
 "Let It Be Me/Give Peace a Chance" (Gilbert Bécaud, Mann Curtis; Lennon, McCartney) – 4:10

Personnel

Performance
Don Everly – guitar, vocals
Phil Everly – guitar, vocals
Robert Knigge – bass
Sam McCue – guitar 
Tiny Schneider – drums

Production
Bill Inglot – mastering 
Jim Marshall – cover photo 
Andrew Sandoval – mastering 
Dave Schultz – mastering 
Ed Thrasher – art direction, photography 
Richie Unterberger – liner notes

References

The Everly Brothers live albums
1970 live albums
Warner Records live albums